Dylan Teddy Ngallot Mboumbouni (born 20 February 1996) is a professional footballer who plays as a centre-back for Liga I club CS Mioveni. Born in France, he represents the Central African Republic national football team at international level.

Club career
A member Olympique Lyonnais Reserves and Academy since 2005, Mboumbouni signed his first professional contract with Olympique Lyonnais on 13 May 2016. He received his selection senior Lyon squad in a Ligue 1 match against AS Monaco on 12 October 2017.

On 24 June 2019, SO Cholet announced the permanent signing of Mboumbouni, with the player penning a two-year deal with the Championnat National club.

On 1 August 2022, Mboumbouni signed with Jerv in Norway.

International career
Mboumbouni was born in France and is of Central African descent, and was a youth international for France at the U16 level. He made his debut with the Central African Republic national football team in a friendly 3–0 loss to Algeria on 14 November 2017.

International stats
Statistics accurate as of match played 4 June 2021

References

External links
 
 
 
 
 OL Web Profile
 

1996 births
Living people
Footballers from Lyon
Association football defenders
Citizens of the Central African Republic through descent
Central African Republic footballers
Central African Republic international footballers
French footballers
France youth international footballers
French sportspeople of Central African Republic descent
Olympique Lyonnais players
SO Cholet players
FK Jerv players
CS Mioveni players
Championnat National players
Championnat National 2 players
Eliteserien players
Liga I players
French expatriate footballers
Central African Republic expatriate footballers
Expatriate footballers in Norway
French expatriate sportspeople in Norway
Central African Republic expatriate sportspeople in Norway
French expatriate sportspeople in Romania
Central African Republic expatriate sportspeople in Romania